Friendship Valley Farm is a historic home and farm complex located at Westminster, Carroll County, Maryland, United States. It was established in the late 18th century. About that time a -story "T"-shaped main house was built of brick on a stone foundation. It was later expanded to its current "H" shape. One of the small log cabins still standing near the house was once a slave cabin.  It was later used as a smoke house. Also on the property is a large brick wash-house and summer kitchen built in 1860, with a bell tower on the roof.

Friendship Valley Farm was listed on the National Register of Historic Places in 1977.

References

External links
, including photo from 1976, at Maryland Historical Trust

Houses on the National Register of Historic Places in Maryland
Houses in Carroll County, Maryland
Houses completed in 1865
Westminster, Maryland
National Register of Historic Places in Carroll County, Maryland
Slave cabins and quarters in the United States